Platyptilia gravior is a moth of the family Pterophoridae. It is known from Costa Rica.

The wingspan is 24–28 mm. Adults are on wing in April, May and June.

External links

gravior
Endemic fauna of Costa Rica
Moths described in 1932